The Battle of Tashkessen or Battle of Tashkesan (Turkish: Taşkesen Muharebesi) was a battle of the Russo-Turkish War of 1877–1878. It was fought between the Ottoman Empire and the Russian Empire on December 31, 1877, in what is now Bulgaria.

The battle
The army of Shakir Pasha, some 14,000 men, was on retreat from the village of Kamarli towards Sofia. Shakir Pasha's army was threatened by a Russian force that Burnaby claimed had 30,000 men and "30 battalions of the Russian Guard" from its left flank, under the command of General Iosif Gurko, and another one, said to be 22,000 men strong before Kamarli.
2,400–4,000 men, 7 guns and two cavalry squadrons of Shakir Pasha's army had been detached under the command of Valentine Baker, a British-born Ottoman general. Baker Pasha was given orders to hold off the advancing Russian army in order to secure the retreat of Shakir Pasha's remaining troops. Baker Pasha entrenched his forces in the village of Taşkesen (now Sarantsi, Bulgaria). The superior Russian army surrounded the Ottomans, but its troops were scattered over a large territory, could not unite together and were slowed by deep snow, winter storm and difficult mountain terrain, so that only a part of them engaged; having a strong defensive position and with weather in their favour, the Ottomans successfully managed to hold off the advancing Russian forces for ten hours, allowing Shakir Pasha to withdraw, and hastily retreated as soon as the firing died down. At the end of the day the Ottoman forces were facing a Russian force ten times its size and ultimately left their position. Burnaby declared that the skirmish had cost the Russians more than 2,000 men and the Ottomans had lost more than 800 men, although the Russians established that only 562 of their men were killed and wounded in total.

During the night panic broke out in the Ottoman ranks, after rumours spread that the Russians had made a flanking movement. This caused the Ottomans to flee the village, killing the inhabitants. Valentine Baker remarked: "We must burn that village to cover our crimes". One of his officers, Allix, accompanied by some men, advanced on the village that had just been captured by the Russians and Bulgarians. They set fire to some straw stacks, which quickly ignited the houses.

References
George Bruce. Harbottle's Dictionary of Battles. (Van Nostrand Reinhold, 1981).
Frederick Gustavus Burnaby. On Horseback Through Asia Minor. (Cosimo Inc., 2007, originally published in 1878).
Frank Jastrzembski. Valentine Baker's Heroic Stand At Tashkessen 1877 A Tarnished British Soldier's Glorious Victory. (Pen & Sword, 2017) ISBN 9781473866805

Tashkessen
Tashkessen
Tashkessen
1877 in Bulgaria
Tashkessen
Tashkessen
History of Sofia Province
1877 in the Ottoman Empire
December 1877 events